This list of ship directions provides succinct definitions for terms applying to spatial orientation in a marine environment or location on a vessel, such as fore, aft, astern, aboard, or topside.

Terms
 Abaft (preposition): at or toward the stern of a ship, or further back from a location, e.g. the mizzenmast is abaft the mainmast.
 Aboard: onto or within a ship, or in a group.
 Above: a higher deck of the ship.
 Aft (adjective):  toward the stern (rear) of a ship.
 Adrift: floating in the water without propulsion.
 Aground: resting on the shore or wedged against the sea floor.
 Ahull: with sails furled and helm lashed alee.
 Alee: on or toward the lee (the downwind side).
 Aloft: the stacks, masts, rigging, or other area above the highest solid structure.
 Amidships: near the middle part of a ship.
 Aport: toward the port side of a ship (opposite of "astarboard").
 Ashore: on or towards the shore or land.
 Astarboard: toward the starboard side of a ship (opposite of "aport").
 Astern (adjective): toward the rear of a ship (opposite of "forward").
 Athwartships: toward the sides of a ship.
 Aweather: toward the weather or windward side of a ship.
 Aweigh: just clear of the sea floor, as with an anchor.
 Below: a lower deck of the ship.
 Belowdecks: inside or into a ship, or down to a lower deck.
 Bilge: the underwater part of a ship between the flat of the bottom and the vertical topsides
 Bottom: the lowest part of the ship's hull.
 Bow: front of a ship (opposite of "stern")
 Centerline or centreline: an imaginary, central line drawn from the bow to the stern.
 Fore or forward: at or toward the front of a ship or further ahead of a location (opposite of "aft")
 Inboard: attached inside the ship.
 Keel: the bottom structure of a ship's hull.
 Leeward: side or direction away from the wind (opposite of "windward").
 On deck: to an outside or muster deck (as "all hands on deck").
 On board: on, onto, or within the ship
 Onboard: somewhere on or in the ship.
 Outboard: attached outside the ship.
 Port: the left side of the ship, when facing forward (opposite of "starboard").
 Starboard: the right side of the ship, when facing forward (opposite of "port").
 Stern: the rear of a ship (opposite of "bow").
 Topside: the top portion of the outer surface of a ship on each side above the waterline.
 Underdeck: a lower deck of a ship.
 Yardarm: an end of a yard spar below a sail.
 Waterline: where the water surface meets the ship's hull.
 Weather: side or direction from which wind blows (same as  "windward").
 Windward: side or direction from which wind blows (opposite of "leeward").

Date of first use
 "Aboard": 14th century
 "Aft": 1580
 "Outboard": 1694
 "Inboard": 1830
 "Belowdecks": 1897.

See also
 Deck (ship) - defines the various decks on ships
 Port and starboard - explanation, with signal lights, and history
 Glossary of nautical terms - list of over 2,400 nautical words or phrases

References

Nautical terminology
Directions